Ken Waldman is a writer and musician in Anchorage, Alaska who has published twenty books including 16 volumes of poetry, a book of acrostic poems for kids, a memoir, a creative writing handbook, and a novel.  More than four hundred of his poems have been published in Beloit Poetry Journal, Manoa, Puerto del Sol, Quarterly West, South Dakota Review, Yankee and elsewhere. His short stories have appeared in Gargoyle, Laurel Review, The MacGuffin, and other journals.   Ken's work has been nominated for the Pushcart Prize in both poetry and fiction.

Waldman also plays old-time Appalachian fiddle, clawhammer banjo and mandolin on his nine albums of original Appalachian-style music, traditional tunes, and poetry.   He survived a small plane crash near Nome, Alaska in 1996;  since then he has been a full-time touring artist.  Ken Waldman's musical shows frequently feature the folksinger Willi Carlisle.

Bibliography 
List of Publications

Poetry:

 Nome Poems
 To Live on this Earth
 And Shadow Remained
 Conditions and Cures
 The Secret Visitor's Guide
 As the World Burns - The Sonnets of George W. Bush
 Sports Page
 Leftovers and Gravy
 D is for Dog Team - Alaska acrostic poems for kids
 Trump Sonnets Volume 1 - The First 50 Days
 Trump Sonnets Volume 2 - 33 Commentaries, 33 Dreams
 Trump Sonnets Volume 3 - The International Edition
 Trump Sonnets Volume 4 - The Shrunken Soul Edition
 Trump Sonnets Volume 5 - His Early Virus Monologues
 Trump Sonnets Volume 6 - His Middle Virus Soliloquy
 Trump Sonnets Volume 7 - His Further Virus Monologues
 Trump Sonnets Volume 8 - The Final Four Months

Prose:

 Are you Famous? Touring America with Alaska's Fiddling Poet
 The Writing Party
 Now Entering Alaska Time

Music:

 All Originals, All Traditionals
 55 Tunes, 5 Poems
 Burnt Down House
 A Week in Eek
 Music Party
 Fiddling Poets on Parade
 Some Favorites
 D is for Dog Team (Book Companion)
 As the World Burns (Book Companion)

References 
Official Website

External links

YouTube Channel

Year of birth missing (living people)
Living people
American male poets
21st-century American poets
21st-century American memoirists
Musicians from Anchorage, Alaska
21st-century American male musicians
Writers from Anchorage, Alaska
Poets from Alaska
American mandolinists
American male short story writers
American fiddlers
American banjoists
21st-century American short story writers